Venus Lacy (some sources give her name as Venus Lacey, born February 9, 1967) is an American former star basketball player, at the high school, college, Olympic and professional levels. A wide-bodied, muscular  center, at her best Lacy was an intimidating force inside the paint, both scoring and rebounding. Born in Chattanooga, Tennessee, she won championships at every level, but her American professional career was diminished by injuries she sustained in a 1997 car accident.

High school and college

A local sports heroine (a city parkway is named after her), Lacy led Chattanooga's Brainerd High School to the state championship in 1984.

Venus Lacy attended Louisiana Tech University, which she led to the NCAA Women's Division I Basketball Championship in 1988. The next year, the Lady Techsters made the 1989 Final Four, but lost there to Auburn. In her Senior year, 1990, Louisiana Tech went undefeated through the regular season, and was ranked #1 in the national polls. That year Lacy was a consensus all-American, and was named the WBCA Player of the Year. The 1990 team again made the Final Four, where they were once again upset by their nemesis Auburn. Lacy finished her NCAA career with 266 points scored in the tournament, putting her among the all-time top 10 women at the time. Lacy was inducted into the Louisiana Tech University Athletic Hall of Fame in 2011.

Louisiana Tech statistics
Source

USA Basketball
Lacy played with the USA team at the 1991 Pan American Games, held in Havana, Cuba. The team finished with a record of 4–2, but managed to win the bronze medal. The USA team lost a three point game to Brazil, then responded with wins over Argentina and Cuba, earning a spot in the medal round. The next game was a rematch against Cuba, and this time the team from Cuba won a five point game. The USA beat Canada easily to win the bronze. Lacy averaged 9.4 points per game.

Lacy was also a member of the gold-medal-winning 1996 Olympic team. Lacy was the last player added to the USA's 12-woman roster, joining the team midway through its year-long exhibition tour to add size in the paint. The team went an undefeated 52-0 in this unprecedented Olympic preparation year, against a variety of college, all-star and international teams.

Professional career

Because the U.S. lacked a women's pro league, Lacy's professional career began overseas, where she played for teams in Greece, Italy and Japan. She led Greece to a European championship in the 1995-1996 season.

Lacy was the first player selected by the Seattle Reign in the ABL Draft on June 19, 1996. From this promising start, her luck seemed to turn sour. Lacy was seriously injured in a car accident on February 4, 1997, and completed her season in Seattle on the injured list. After that year, she was selected by the ABL's expansion Long Beach Stingrays. Expansion teams typically fare poorly in their first several years, but this was an exception: Long Beach made the ABL Finals in their first and only season, where they lost the championship to the Columbus Quest, two games to three. (After winning the first two games, played in Long Beach due to scheduling conflicts in Columbus, the Stingrays were unable to win in Columbus.) Notwithstanding their on-court success, the Long Beach franchise folded after one year, and next year Lacy was once again drafted by another ABL expansion team, the even shorter-lived Nashville Noise. Just 15 games into the 1998-1999 season, on December 22, 1998, the ABL itself folded.

No doubt due to her injuries, Lacy went undrafted by any WNBA team in the special post-ABL consolidation draft. However, midway through the 1999 season, Lacy was picked up by the  New York Liberty to fill in for their injured All-star center, Rebecca Lobo. Lacy played in 17 games that year for the Liberty, and in 2 more in 2000, but without much success. She has not played in the WNBA since.

References

External links 
 Chattanooga City Council Resolution dated July 16, 1996 dedicating Venus Lacey (sic) Parkway
 Chattanooga City Council Resolution dated Aug. 6, 1996 honoring Venus Lacy
 1999 New York Liberty Statistics

1967 births
Living people
African-American basketball players
All-American college women's basketball players
American women's basketball players
Basketball players at the 1991 Pan American Games
Basketball players at the 1996 Summer Olympics
Basketball players from Tennessee
Centers (basketball)
Long Beach Stingrays players
Louisiana Tech Lady Techsters basketball players
Medalists at the 1996 Summer Olympics
Nashville Noise players
New York Liberty players
Olympic gold medalists for the United States in basketball
Pan American Games bronze medalists for the United States
Pan American Games medalists in basketball
Seattle Reign (basketball) players
Medalists at the 1991 Pan American Games
21st-century African-American people
21st-century African-American women
20th-century African-American sportspeople
20th-century African-American women
20th-century African-American people
United States women's national basketball team players